Mirror Stars is the first American album by the Fabulous Poodles. The album was a reconfigured version of their second British album Unsuitable with four tracks added from their debut album Fabulous Poodles. The album was well received by American critics and reached No. 61 in the Billboard 200 album chart in 1979.

Track listing
All songs written by Tony De Meur and John Parsons except where noted.

Side one:

 "Mirror Star" – 4:27
 "Work Shy" – 3:30
 "Chicago Boxcar" – 3:56 (De Meur, Parsons, Jonathan Bentley, Robert Suffolk)
 "Oh Cheryl" – 3:25
 "Toytown People" – 2:10

Side two:

 "Mr. Mike" – 3:38
 "Roll Your Own" – 2:46 (Mel McDaniel)
 "B Movies" – 3:18
 "Tit Photographer Blues" – 2:48 (Jay Myrdal, De Meur, Parsons)
 "Cherchez la Femme" – 3:38

"Work Shy", "Mr. Mike", "Roll Your Own" and "Cherchez la Femme" were recorded in June 1977 and were produced by John Entwistle.

Personnel
 Tony De Meur – lead vocals, guitars, electric sitar, harmonica
 Richie C. Robertson – bass, guitar, keyboards, percussion, backing vocals
 Bobby Valentino – violin, mandolin, backing vocals
 Bryn Burrows – drums, percussion, backing vocals
 John Entwistle - bass on "Mr. Mike" and "Cherchez la Femme"

References

1978 debut albums
Epic Records albums
Albums produced by John Entwistle
Albums produced by Muff Winwood